Information integration (II) is the merging of information from heterogeneous sources with differing conceptual, contextual and typographical representations. It is used in data mining and consolidation of data from unstructured or semi-structured resources. Typically, information integration refers to textual representations of knowledge but is sometimes applied to rich-media content. Information fusion, which is a related term, involves the combination of information into a new set of information towards reducing redundancy and uncertainty.

Examples of technologies available to integrate information include deduplication, and string metrics which allow the detection of similar text in different data sources by fuzzy matching. A host of methods for these research areas are available such as those presented in the International Society of Information Fusion. Other methods rely on causal estimates of the outcomes based on a model of the sources.

See also
 Data fusion (is a subset of Information integration)
 Sensor fusion
 Data integration
 Image fusion
 Synesthesia

Books
 
 
 Springer, Information Fusion in Data Mining (2003), 
 H. B. Mitchell, Multi-sensor Data Fusion – An Introduction (2007) Springer-Verlag, Berlin, 
 S. Das, High-Level Data Fusion (2008), Artech House Publishers, Norwood, MA,  and 1596932813
 E. P. Blasch, E. Bosse, and D. A. Lambert, High-Level Information Fusion Management and System Design (2012), Artech House Publishers, Norwood, MA.  |

References

External links
 Discriminant Correlation Analysis (DCA)
 Information Integration Using Logical View LNCS 1997.
 International Society of Information Fusion

Data management

ar:تكامل البيانات
de:Informationsintegration